Joseph Kiker (16 May 1889 – 25 February 1959) was  a former Australian rules footballer who played with Richmond in the Victorian Football League (VFL).

Football

Mitcham Football Club

Richmond Football Club (VFL)
He played in one First XVIII match with Richmond in the Victorian Football League (VFL) in 1909; he was a "new" player that Richmond, which did not make the finals in 1909, tried out in the last match of the 1909 season, against Geelong, on 4 September 1909. Playing at centre half-forward he kicked one of his team's four goals.

Melbourne City Football Club (VFA)
He was cleared from Richmond to the Melbourne City Football Club in the Victorian Football Association (VFA) in 1912, and played against Footscray in the team's first VFA competition match, on 27 April 1912.

Hawthorn Football Club (VFA)
The Melbourne City Football Club withdrew from the VFA competition after only two seasons (1912 and 1913), and its place was taken in the 1914 competition by the  Hawthorn Football Club. Kiker transferred to Hawthorn and played in its first VFA competition match, against Port Melbourne, on 13 April 1914.

Notes

References
 Hogan, P: The Tigers Of Old, Richmond FC, (Melbourne), 1996. 
 
 Mitcham Football Club (photograph), Picture Victoria.

External links 
 
 
 Joe Kiker, at The VFA Project.

1889 births
1959 deaths
Australian rules footballers from Melbourne
Richmond Football Club players
Melbourne City Football Club (VFA) players
Hawthorn Football Club (VFA) players
People from Burwood, Victoria